Kuźnia most often refers to:
 Kuźnia, Greater Poland Voivodeship
 Kuźnia, Masovian Voivodeship

It may also refer to the following places in Poland:
 Dębska Kuźnia, a village in Opole Voivodeship
 Domaradzka Kuźnia, a village in Opole Voivodeship
 Kolonia Kuźnia, a village in Masovian Voivodeship
 Kuźnia Goszczańska, a village in Lower Silesian Voivodeship
 Kuźnia Nieborowska, a village in Silesian Voivodeship
 Kuźnia Raciborska, a town in Silesian Voivodeship
 Ligota-Ligocka Kuźnia, a district of Rybnik, Silesian Voivodeship
 Nowa Kuźnia (disambiguation), several villages
 Stara Kuźnia, Opole Voivodeship

See also